The Reih Bleeaney Vanannan is the Isle of Man's most prestigious annual award for culture. It is presented by Culture Vannin to the person or group who, in the opinion of the panel of assessors, has made the most outstanding contribution to Manx culture. It is officially presented by the President of Culture Vannin (the new name of the Manx Heritage Foundation), normally in January each year.

Recipients of the Reih Bleeaney Vanannan ('Manannan's Choice of the Year' in Manx Gaelic) are entitled to use the letters RBV after their name. They hold the trophy for one year, as well as receiving a medal and a donation to be split between themselves and a Manx cultural cause of their choice.

It was first awarded in 1987, as a part of the Foundation's overarching policy "to support and promote Manx culture" established at the creation of the Foundation through the Manx Heritage Foundation Act 1982 (an Act of Tynwald). The panel of assessors for the award is appointed by Culture Vannin and represents the key Manx cultural organisations. The panel consists of representatives from Yn Çheshaght Ghailckagh, Yn Chruinnaght, the Isle of Man Arts Council, Culture Vannin and Manx National Heritage. Nominations are invited from the public in November of each year.

The RBV trophy consists of the figure of the sea-god Manannan standing on a piece of Pooilvaaish marble, resting on a plinth. It also contains traces of quartz from the South Barrule, one of Manannan's fortresses, and a brooch of Laxey silver in the form of the Three Legs of Man presented by Mona Douglas. It was designed by the late Eric Austwick. The medal presented to each recipient is designed by Jennie Kissack and executed in silver and enamel by Tony Lewis of Peel.

Recipients of the Reih Bleeaney Vanannan award

References

Manx culture
Awards established in 1987
1987 establishments in the United Kingdom